Clark Peterson (born February 7, 1966) is an American film producer and entertainment executive. He produced the Academy Award-winning film Monster, starring Charlize Theron, and has created and produced a wide variety of award-winning films, documentaries, and television movies. He is also a member of the Academy of Motion Pictures Arts and Sciences.

Life and career
A graduate of Stanford University, Peterson began his career working in script development and film production for producer Roger Corman before later joining Walt Disney Studios as an executive and going on to serve as a senior executive at several independent film companies. Peterson continues to develop and produce as a Partner and Managing Director of Remstar Studios, a production company and fund based in Los Angeles and Montreal.

In recent years, Peterson produced the critically acclaimed and Annie award-nominated Kahlil Gibran's The Prophet directed by Roger Allers and featuring the voices of Liam Neeson and Salma Hayek-Pinault. He produced writer/director Robert Jury's 2020 debut film Working Man, which stars Peter Gerety, Billy Brown, and Academy Award nominee Talia Shire. Richard Roeper of the Chicago Sun-Times noted the film contained "Some of the most powerful acting I've seen in any movie this year," and Pete Hammond of Deadline said the film "defines what smart independent moviemaking is all about." He produced the 2018's comedy Ideal Home, written and directed by Andrew Fleming, and starring Paul Rudd and Steve Coogan, and executive produced the science fiction thriller Replicas, starring Keanu Reeves and Alice Eve. Other recent projects include Rampart directed by Oren Moverman from a screenplay by James Ellroy and starring Woody Harrelson, Devil's Knot, directed by Atom Egoyan and starring Colin Firth and Reese Witherspoon, and Decoding Annie Parker, starring Helen Hunt, Samantha Morton, and Aaron Paul.  Earlier projects include My Date with Drew, Dim Sum Funeral, and East of Havana, a documentary about the Cuban hip-hop scene.

In television, he has developed a number of television series and pilots, and was named to Deadline Hollywood's list of "Overachievers" for the 2015 television pilot season. 
Additionally, Peterson recently authored a guest column for the Hollywood Reporter entitled "Why Patty Jenkins' Wonder Woman Success Shouldn't Be Surprising", based on his experiences producing Monster which was Jenkins' first film.

Personal life
In 2010, he married Stacy Rukeyser in Los Angeles. Rukeyser is a television writer and current showrunner of UnReal on Lifetime and Hulu networks and is the daughter of Louis Rukeyser the former host of Wall Street Week. They have two children.

Filmography
 Working Man (2020)...producer
 Replicas (2018)...executive producer
 Ideal Home (2018)...producer
 The Prophet (2014)...producer
 Devil's Knot (2013)...producer
 Decoding Annie Parker (2013)...producer
 Rampart (2011)....producer
 Dear Mr. Gacy (2010)....producer
 Dim Sum Funeral (2008)....executive producer
 Behind the Smile (2006)....producer
 East of Havana (2006)....producer
 My Date with Drew (2004)....executive producer
 Monster (2003)....producer
 Risk (2003)....executive producer
 Tart (2001)....executive producer
 The Watcher (2000)....co-producer
 A Table for One (1999)....producer
 The Landlady (1998)....co-producer
 The Killing Grounds (1998)....(co-producer
 The Night Caller (1998)....co-producer
 Man of Her Dreams (1997)....co-producer
 Wishmaster (1997)....producer
 Stranger in the House (1997)....executive producer
 Cupid (1997)....producer
 The Nurse (1997)....co-producer
 Daddy's Girl (1996)....co-producer
 Dead Cold (1996)....co-producer
 The Wrong Woman (1995)....executive producer
 The Secretary (1995)....co-producer
 Marked Man (1995)....co-executive producer

References

1966 births
American film producers
Living people